The 1956–57 season was Newport County's 29th season in the Football League and 10th consecutive season in the Third Division South since relegation from the Second Division at the end of the 1946–47 season.

Season review

Results summary

Results by round

Fixtures and results

Third Division South

FA Cup

Welsh Cup

League table

P = Matches played; W = Matches won; D = Matches drawn; L = Matches lost; F = Goals for; A = Goals against; GA = Goal average; Pts = Points

External links
 Newport County 1956-1957 : Results
 Newport County football club match record: 1957
 Welsh Cup 1956/57

References

1956-57
English football clubs 1956–57 season
1956–57 in Welsh football